John Norman Carter AO (born 28 December 1944) is an Australian medical academic and endocrinologist.

Early life
Carter was born in Melbourne, Australia, and attended Newington College (1957-1961) before graduating in medicine from the University of Sydney.

Medical career
 Clinical Fellow Garvan Institute 1973-1975
 Postgraduate Fellow University of Manitoba 1975-1977
 Consultant Endocrinologist since 1977
 Clinical Associate Professor Department of Medicine, University of Sydney  1998-2010
Clinical Professor Department of Medicine, University of Sydney since 2010

Committees
 President, Australian Diabetes Society 1992-1994

Fellowships and Honours
 Fellow, Royal Australasian College of Physicians
 Officer, Order of Australia (2000)

References

1944 births
Living people
Australian endocrinologists
Academic staff of the University of Sydney
Sydney Medical School alumni
People educated at Newington College
Officers of the Order of Australia
Fellows of the Royal College of Physicians